Tappahannock Municipal Airport  was a town-owned public-use airport located one nautical mile (1.85 km) west of the central business district of Tappahannock, a town in Essex County, Virginia, United States. It was located south of the intersection of Route 17 & Airport Road.

The airport closed in 2007, following the opening of Tappahannock-Essex County Airport .

History 
The Tappahannock Flight Strip opened in 1944 and had a  hard-surfaced runway. It was one of many flight strips built during World War II for emergency use by military aircraft. Sometime after the war it was converted to civilian use. By 1968, a state airport directory listed Tappahannock Municipal Airport as operated by the Town of Tappahannock and containing a shorter 2,800-foot paved runway.

Facilities and aircraft 
For the 12-month period ending July 31, 2006, the airport had 6,990 aircraft operations, an average of 19 per day:
99% general aviation and 1% military.

References 

Defunct airports in Virginia
Airports in Virginia
Transportation in Essex County, Virginia
Flight Strips of the United States Army Air Forces
Airfields of the United States Army Air Forces in Virginia
Airports established in 1944
1944 establishments in Virginia
Airports disestablished in 2007
2007 disestablishments in Virginia